Lebialem is a department of Southwest Province in Cameroon. The department covers an area of 617 km and as of 2005 had a total population of 113,736. The capital of the department lies at Menji. Lebialem got its name from the Lebialem Falls, a twin water fall, which means ' a hill from which water drops '. The county is dominated by two ethnic groups, the Mundani to the north and the Bangwa to the south (ba meaning people of), though other ethnic groups exists, the makeup a minority, example the  Mbo, Banyangi and Bamiléké.

Since the outbreak of the Anglophone Crisis in 2017, much of Lebialem has come under the control of the Red Dragon militia, which were led by Lekeaka Oliver until he was shot dead on July 12, 2022. In October 2019, after forcing traditional rulers to flee, Oliver declared himself "Paramount Ruler of Lebialem". As of May 2020, much of Lebialem district is under the control of Oliver and his Red Dragon militia.

Subdivisions
The department is divided administratively into 3 districts and in turn into 17 villages or Fundons.

Communes 
 Alou
 Fontem (Menji)
  Mundaniland

References

Departments of Cameroon
Southwest Region (Cameroon)